Brampton City Hall is home to Brampton City Council and the departments of the city. It is located at the intersection of Wellington Street and Main Street in downtown Brampton.

History

A park on the site for many years was home to the Brampton Cenotaph (opened in 1928 by Governor General Lord Willingdon), it was named Memorial Park. (A park at South Fletcher's Sportsplex now uses the name and the old former park named Ken Whillans Square) A downtown bus terminal on part of the site opened after 1976 and was closed at some point before 1989, to accommodate construction of the building. (bus services have been relocated to the Downtown Transit Centre)

The six-storey building was designed by Robert J. Posliff Architect Inc.  and Inzola Construction completed the project in 1991. The building features a bell tower and a curved entrance with columns. A two-storey addition was also added.

A nine-storey tower opened in 2014 at 41 George Street as part of the Southwest Quadrant Renewal Plan and is connected to City Hall by a glass walkway called Heritage Way. It will house city staff, community rooms and retail space. The site required the demolition of a 4-storey commercial building and a parking lot. It is also a functioning clock tower.

List of former Town Halls and Civic Centres

 Brampton's Old Fire Hall, built in 1854 at 2 Chapel Street, was originally a market hall. The second floor "long room" was being used by the village council chambers by 1860.  The first meeting of Brampton Town Council took place here in 1874. Council meetings were held here until 1911. 
 Heggie Block, (built 1860) at 8 Main Street South, was home for town meetings from 1911 until 1965. 
 Queen's Square Building (completed 1965) at 24 Queen Street East was home to Council meetings from 1965 until 1974. Renovated by Inzola Construction in 2001 and renamed Market Square Business Centre.
 Chinguacousy Civic Centre opened in 1972 at 150 Central Park Drive and is home to the Lester B. Pearson Theatre. Home to Brampton City Council from 1974 until 1991.
 Brampton City Hall, at 2 Wellington Street West, has been home to city council since 1991.

See also
 Peel Art Gallery, Museum and Archives - located near City Hall

References

Municipal buildings in Brampton
City and town halls in Ontario
Clock towers in Canada